Coxbench Hall is a late 18th-century country house, now in use as a residential home for the elderly, situated at Holbrook, Amber Valley, Derbyshire. It is a Grade II listed building.

The Manor of Coxbench was held anciently by the Franceys family until the daughter and heiress of the last male Franceys married William Brooks. Their grandson William Brooks Johnson (1763–1830) replaced the old manor house with the present house built by John Chambers of Horsley Woodhouse.

The main block is built to a square plan, with a three-storey, three-bayed entrance front to the east, which carries a Tuscan porch with iron balustrading. A service wing to the north west incorporates a datestone inscribed WB1774. A stable block continues the range to the north.

The property had numerous occupants during the 19th century, including Meynell and  Alleyne.

Since 1984 the house has been in use as a residential care home for the elderly, and has gained the status of being a Quality Premium Home.  There are also award-winning Close Care Apartments in the beautiful grounds.

See also
Listed buildings in Holbrook, Derbyshire

References

Grade II listed buildings in Derbyshire
Country houses in Derbyshire